The 2007 Sunfeast Open was a Tier III tennis event on the 2007 WTA Tour, organised for women's professional tennis. This was the third edition of the tournament.

Entrants

Seeds

Qualifiers

These players got entry from the qualifying draw.

  Naomi Cavaday
  Ekaterina Ivanova
  Neha Uberoi
  Marta Domachowska

Lucky losers

These players entered through the Lucky loser spot.

  Monique Adamczak
  Sandy Gumulya

Wildcards

The following players received Wildcards into the main draw.

  Sunitha Rao
  Tara Iyer
  Kyra Shroff

Champions

Singles

 Maria Kirilenko def.  Mariya Koryttseva, 6-0, 6-2

Doubles

 Alla Kudryavtseva (RUS) /   Vania King (USA) defeated  Alberta Brianti (ITA)  /  Mariya Koryttseva (UKR), 6-1, 6-4

2007 WTA Tour
Sunfeast Open
2007 in Indian tennis